Valhalla Canyon is located in Grand Teton National Park, in the U. S. state of Wyoming. The canyon was formed by glaciers which retreated at the end of the last glacial maximum approximately 15,000 years ago, leaving behind a U-shaped valley. Valhalla Canyon extends from the northwest flanks of Grand Teton and Mount Owen and ends in Cascade Canyon.

See also
Canyons of the Teton Range
Geology of the Grand Teton area

References

Canyons and gorges of Grand Teton National Park